State Trunk Highway 85 (often called Highway 85, STH-85 or WIS 85) is a  state highway in Pepin, Dunn, and Eau Claire counties in Wisconsin, United States.

Route description
WIS 85 runs east–west in west central Wisconsin from Durand to just southwest of Eau Claire. About midway along the route, the highway passes through Rock Falls, and  further, Caryville, the only two recognizable settlements between the route's termini. In recent years, the corridor between Rock Falls and Caryville, especially the western side of the highway along the Chippewa River, has seen some suburban development.

Major intersections

See also

References

External links

085
Transportation in Pepin County, Wisconsin
Transportation in Dunn County, Wisconsin
Transportation in Eau Claire County, Wisconsin